Syedna Mohammed Ezzuddin Bin Syedi Jivanjee (died on 19 Ramadan al-Moazzam 1236 AH/1821 AD, Surat, India) was the 44th Da'i al-Mutlaq of the Dawoodi Bohra sect. He succeeded the 43rd Da'i, Syedna Abde'Ali Saifuddin, to the religious post at the age of 29. He was born in 1788.

 Dai period: 1232–1236 AH/1817–1821 AD
 Place of dai office: Surat, India
 Death:19 Ramadan al-Moazzam 1236
 Mazoon: Syedi SheikhAdam Safiyuddin
 Mukasir: Tayyeb Zainuddin

Family
His father was Syedi Jivanjee bin Shaikh Dawood bhai and his mother was Buji BaiSaheba binte Mulla Ahmed-ji. He was the brother of the Da'i who succeeded him, Syedna Tayyeb Zainuddin. Buji BaiSaheba's father was the grandson of Syedi Abdul Qadir Hakimuddin while her mother Aamena BaiSaheba was the great-grand-daughter of Syedi Hasanji Badshah, a descendant of Syedi Fakhruddin Shaheed.

Accession
Syedna Mohammed Ezzuddin became Da'i al-Mutlaq in 1232 AH/1817 AD at the age of 29. His period of Dawat was 1232–1236 AH/1817–1821 AD.

Death
Syedna Mohammed Ezzuddin suffered from acute abdominal pain which had a debilitating effect. He died at the age of 33.

References

Further reading
The Ismaili, their history and doctrine by Farhad Daftary (Chapter -Mustalian Ismailism- p. 300-310)

Dawoodi Bohra da'is
1788 births
1836 deaths
19th-century Ismailis